McConnaughey is a surname. Notable people with the surname include:

George McConnaughey (c. 1897–1966), chairman of the Federal Communications Commission
Ralph McConnaughey (1889–1966), American baseball player

See also
Matthew McConaughey (born 1969), American actor, director, producer and writer
McConnaughay
McConaughy